The Samuel Freeman House (also known as the Samuel and Harriet Freeman House) is a Frank Lloyd Wright house in the Hollywood Hills of Los Angeles, California built in 1923.  The house was listed on the National Register of Historic Places in 1971. The house has also been listed as a California Historical Landmark #1011, and as Los Angeles Historic-Cultural Monument #247 in 1981.

As an example of Wright's Mayan Revival or early Modernist architecture, the structure is noteworthy as one of the four textile block houses built by Wright in the Los Angeles area, the others being Storer House, Ennis House, and Millard House. The construction manager on site was Wright's son, Lloyd Wright.

In 1986, the Freeman House was bequeathed to the USC School of Architecture. In 2005, a stabilization project was completed using a $901,000 FEMA grant and $1.5 million in school funds. A five-year program of documenting the history and condition of the house resulted in a 3200-page, seven volume set of books compiled and edited by Benjamin McAlister, Karen M. Kensek, Douglas E. Noble, and Celeste Rodriguez.  Publication of the books in 2014 was supported by a grant from the Graham Foundation for Advanced Studies in the Fine Arts.

See also
 Los Angeles Historic-Cultural Monuments in Hollywood
 List of Registered Historic Places in Los Angeles
 Hollywood Heights, Los Angeles

References

Further reading
Storrer, William Allin. The Frank Lloyd Wright Companion. University Of Chicago Press, 2006,  (S.216)
Chusid, Jeffrey M. 2011. Saving Wright, the Freeman House and the Preservation of Meaning, Materials, and Modernity. New York: W.W. Norton & Co (ISBN 978-0393733020).

External links

Freeman House, USC
Freeman House photos

Frank Lloyd Wright buildings
Modernist architecture in California
Houses on the National Register of Historic Places in Los Angeles
University of Southern California buildings and structures
Houses completed in 1923
Hollywood Hills
History of Los Angeles County, California
1923 establishments in California